Eastern Suburbs (now known as the Sydney Roosters) competed in their 31st New South Wales Rugby League season in 1938.

Line-up: for the 1938 season included -  Jack Arnold, D.Bartlett, F.Bell, Aidan Cairns, Steve Callaghan, John Clarke, Percy Dermond, Dick Dunn, Noel Hollingdale, A.Horsell,  J.McCarthy, Ross McKinnon, Andy Norval, Sid 'Joe' Pearce, Henry 'harry' Pierce. Ray Stehr.

Ladder

Results
Premiership Round 2, Monday 25 April 1938 -
South Sydney 21 (Felsch, Thompson, Brown Tries; Williams 5, Felsch Goals) defeated Eastern Suburbs 14 played at the Sydney Cricket Ground.
This was Easts 1st defeat since 22 June 1935

References

External links
Rugby League Tables and Statistics

Sydney Roosters seasons
East